Cystophora is a genus of brown algae found mostly in temperate waters around Australia. Most of the southern Australian species can be immediately recognised as belonging to this genus by their characteristic zigzag branching pattern. Identification of individual species is generally more difficult and relies on the size and shape of branches, particularly terminal branches, which are specialised reproductive structures known as receptacles. Due to their local diversity and dominance in southern Australia, they are regarded by some as 'the eucalypts of the underwater world'.

Species 
According to AlgaeBASE :
 Cystophora botryocystis Sonder
 Cystophora brownii (Turner) J.Agardh
 Cystophora congesta Womersley & Nizamuddin ex Womersley
 Cystophora cuspidata J.Agardh
 Cystophora cymodocea Womersley & Nizamuddin ex Womersley
 Cystophora distenta J.Agardh
 Cystophora expansa Womersley
 Cystophora fibrosa Simons
 Cystophora flaccida J.Agardh
 Cystophora gracilis Womersley
 Cystophora grevillei (C.Agardh ex Sonder) J.Agardh
 Cystophora harveyi Womersley
 Cystophora intermedia J.Agardh
 Cystophora lenormandiana (Debeaux) De Toni (Sans vérification)
 Cystophora monilifera J.Agardh
 Cystophora moniliformis (Esper) Womersley & Nizamuddin
 Cystophora pectinata (Greville & C.Agardh ex Sonder) J.Agardh
 Cystophora platylobium (Mertens) J.Agardh
 Cystophora polycystidea Areschoug ex J.Agardh
 Cystophora racemosa (Harvey ex Kützing) J.Agardh
 Cystophora retorta (Mertens) J.Agardh
 Cystophora retroflexa (Labillardière) J.Agardh (type)
 Cystophora scalaris J.Agardh
 Cystophora siliquosa J.Agardh
 Cystophora subfarcinata (Mertens) J.Agardh
 Cystophora tenuis Womersley
 Cystophora torulosa (R.Brown ex Turner) J.Agardh
 Cystophora xiphocarpa Harvey

According to CatalogueofLife :
 Cystophora botryocystis
 Cystophora brownii
 Cystophora congesta
 Cystophora cuspidata
 Cystophora cymodocea
 Cystophora distenda
 Cystophora expansa
 Cystophora fibrosa
 Cystophora gracilis
 Cystophora grevillei
 Cystophora harveyi
 Cystophora intermedia
 Cystophora monilifera
 Cystophora moniliformis
 Cystophora pectinata
 Cystophora platylobium
 Cystophora polycystidea
 Cystophora racemosa
 Cystophora retorta
 Cystophora retroflexa
 Cystophora scalaris
 Cystophora siliquosa
 Cystophora subfarcinata
 Cystophora tenuis
 Cystophora torulosa
 Cystophora xiphocarpa

References 

Fucales
Fucales genera
Taxa named by Jacob Georg Agardh